Clear Hills 152C is an Indian reserve of the Horse Lake First Nation in Alberta, located within Clear Hills County. It is 56 kilometers northwest of Fairview. In the 2016 Canadian Census, it recorded a population of 0 living in 1 of its 5 total private dwellings.

References

Indian reserves in Alberta
Clear Hills County